The Banskobystricka latka is an annual indoor high jump competition which takes place at the Stiavnicky Sport Hall in Banská Bystrica, Slovakia. It was formerly known as the Europa SC High Jump due to sponsorship by the Europa Shopping Center, the city's main shopping mall.

History
The event was established in 1993 by a group of athletics enthusiasts, including Ľubomír Roško, Július Nyárjas, Róbert Ruffíni, and Robert Rozim. The first edition was held in the city's Štiavničkách Sports Hall and saw Šárka Kašpárková win the women's contest with a Czech record of 1.95 metres. The competition quickly attracted a high calibre of European competitors: Dalton Grant won the second men's competition prior to his victory at the 1994 European Athletics Indoor Championships and Sorin Matei set a meet record of 2.36 m at the third edition.

The meeting was not held in 2002. Stefan Holm was the winner of the 10th edition in 2003 with a jump of 2.34 m and he went on to take his second World Indoor title two months later. Holm repeated his clearance to win the year after – the same year he became Olympic champion. Blanka Vlašić raised the women's meet record to 2.05 m which was a Croatian record and made her the fourth best indoor jumper ever at the time. In the men's contest that year Andrey Sokolovskiy equalled the meet record of 2.36 m and Kyriakos Ioannou cleared a Cypriot record of 2.30 m in third place. In 2007 Holm took his third career victory with a meet record of 2.37 m and also managed to clear the 2.30 m mark for the 100th time in his competitive career. Venelina Veneva won the women's jump in 2.02 m, but was later disqualified for doping. Runner-up Antonietta Di Martino broke the Italian record with her two-metre jump.

At the 2009 edition both Linus Thörnblad and Jesse Williams cleared 2.36 m, which made them joint second best in the world that year. Russia's Ivan Ukhov broke the meet record with a jump of 2.38 m in 2010 and repeated the feat in 2011 – both marks were the best indoor performances that year. Vlašić took her fourth career victory in 2.04 m in 2010 and Di Martino improved her Italian record to that standard in 2011.

Past winners
Key: 

 † = Later disqualified for doping. Antonietta Di Martino was the runner-up with 2.00 m.

Statistics

Multiple time winners

Men

Women

Winners by country

 † = Later disqualified for doping.  was the runner-up with 2.00 m.

See also
Moravia High Jump Tour – indoor competition(s) held in Czech Republic in late January

References

List of winners
Winners. Hrdosport. Retrieved on 2012-02-20.

External links
Official website
IAAF reports: 2008, 2012

Athletics competitions in Slovakia
Recurring sporting events established in 1993
Annual indoor track and field meetings
High jump competitions